A waistcoat (UK and Commonwealth,  or ;  colloquially called a weskit), or vest (US and Canada), is a sleeveless upper-body garment. It is usually worn over a dress shirt and necktie and below a coat as a part of most men's formal wear. It is also sported as the third piece in the traditional three-piece male suit. Any given waistcoat can be simple or ornate, or for leisure or luxury. Historically, the waistcoat can be worn either in the place of, or underneath, a larger coat, dependent upon the weather, wearer, and setting.

Daytime formal wear and semi-formal wear commonly comprises a contrastingly coloured waistcoat, such as in buff or dove gray, still seen in morning dress and black lounge suit. For white tie and black tie, it is traditionally white or black, respectively.

Name 
The term waistcoat is used in the United Kingdom and many Commonwealth countries. The term vest is used widely in the United States and Canada, and is often worn as part of formal attire or as the third piece of a lounge suit in addition to a jacket and trousers.  The term vest derives from the French language  "jacket, sport coat", the term for a vest-waistcoat in French today being , the Italian language  "robe, gown", and the Latin language . The term vest in European countries refers to the A-shirt, a type of athletic vest.  The banyan, a garment of India, is commonly called a vest in Indian English.

Characteristics and use

A waistcoat has a full vertical opening in the front, which fastens with buttons or snaps. Both single-breasted and double-breasted waistcoats exist, regardless of the formality of dress, but single-breasted ones are more common.  In a three piece suit, the cloth used matches the jacket and trousers. Waistcoats can also have lapels or revers depending on the style.

Before wristwatches became popular, gentlemen kept their pocket watches in the front waistcoat pocket, with the watch on a watch chain threaded through a buttonhole.  Sometimes an extra hole was made in line with the pockets for this use. A bar on the end of the chain held it in place to catch the chain if it were dropped or pulled.

Wearing a belt with a waistcoat, and indeed any suit, is not traditional.  To give a more comfortable hang to the trousers, the waistcoat instead covers a pair of braces underneath it.

A custom still sometimes practised is to leave the bottom button undone. This is said to have been started by King Edward VII (then the Prince of Wales), whose expanding waistline required it. Variations on this include that he forgot to fasten the lower button when dressing and this was copied. It has also been suggested that the practice originated to prevent the waistcoat riding up when on horseback. Undoing the bottom button avoids stress to the bottom button when sitting down; when it is fastened, the bottom of the waistcoat pulls sideways causing wrinkling and bulging, since modern waistcoats are cut lower than old ones.  This convention only applies to single-breasted day waistcoats and not double breasted, evening, straight-hem or livery waistcoats that are all fully buttoned.

Daywear

Waistcoats worn with lounge suits (now principally single-breasted) normally match the suit in cloth, and have four to six buttons. Double-breasted waistcoats are rare compared to single but are more commonly seen in morning dress. These may either match the colour of the morning coat or be in a contrasting colour, commonly buff, dove gray, or powder blue.

Eveningwear
The waistcoats worn with white- and black- tie are different from standard daytime single-breasted waistcoats, being much lower in cut (with three buttons or four buttons, where all are fastened). The much larger expanse of shirt compared to a daytime waistcoat allows more variety of form, with "U" or "V" shapes possible, and there is large choice of outlines for the tips, ranging from pointed to flat or rounded. The colour normally matches the tie, so only black barathea wool, grosgrain or satin and white marcella, grosgrain or satin are worn, although white waistcoats used to be worn with black tie in early forms of the dress.

Waiters, sometimes also waitresses, and other people working at white-tie events, to distinguish themselves from guests, sometimes wear gray tie, which consists of the dress coat of white tie (a squarely cut away tailcoat) with the black waistcoat and tie of black tie.

Clergy
The variant of the clergy cassock may be cut as a vest. It differs in style from other waistcoats in that the garment buttons to the neck and has an opening that displays the clerical collar.

In the Church of England, a particular High Church clerical vest introduced in the 1830s was nicknamed the "M.B. Waistcoat" with "M.B." standing for the Mark of the Beast.

Scouting
In the Girl Scouts of the USA, vests are used as an alternative to the sash for the display of badges.

Stock trading
In many stock exchanges, traders who engage in open outcry may wear coloured sleeveless waistcoats, or trading jackets, with insignia on the back.

Sport
Waistcoats, alongside bowties, are  commonly worn by billiard players during a tournament. It is usually worn in snooker and blackball tournaments in the United Kingdom.

History

The predecessors to the waistcoat are the Middle Age-era doublet (clothing) and gambeson.

17th–18th centuries
Various types of waistcoats may have been worn in theatrical manners such as performances and masquerades prior to what is said to be the early origins of the vest.
During the 17th century, the forerunner to the three-piece suit was appropriated from the traditional dress of diverse Eastern European and Islamic countries. The justacorps frock coat was copied from the long zupans worn in Poland and the Ukraine, the necktie or cravat was derived from a scarf worn by Croatian mercenaries fighting for King Louis XIII of France, and the brightly coloured silk waistcoats popularised by King Charles II of England were inspired by exotic Indian and Persian attire acquired by wealthy English travellers.

On October 7 of the year 1666, King Charles II of England revealed that he would be launching a new type of fashion piece in men's wear. Scholar Diana De Marly suggests that the formation of such a mode of dress acted as a response to French fashion being so dominant in the time period.  The item King Charles II was referencing on that day was a long piece donned beneath the coat that was meant to be seen. The sleeveless garment may have been popularised by King Charles II, based on the facts that a diary entry by Samuel Pepys (October 8, 1666) records that 'the King hath yesterday Council declared his resolution of setting a fashion for clothes...it will be a vest, I know not well how; but it is to teach the nobility thrift.'

The general layout of the vest in King Charles II's time stands as follows: buttons very closely sewn together arranged in two rows lined the front body of the vest underneath a wide open coat face. This piece, however, was only deemed popular for an average of seven years upon arrival to the public sphere. However, while the vest died out in elite city spaces, it is said to have lived on longer in provinces and by the year 1678 was introduced to the realm of international high fashion.

John Evelyn wrote about waistcoats on October 18, 1666: "To Court, it being the first time his Majesty put himself solemnly into the Eastern fashion of vest, changing doublet, stiff collar, bands and cloak, into a comely dress after the Persian mode, with girdles or straps, and shoestrings and garters into buckles... resolving never to alter it, and to leave the French mode".

Samuel Pepys, the diarist and civil servant, wrote in October 1666 that "the King hath yesterday in council declared his resolution of setting a fashion for clothes which he will never alter. It will be a vest, I know not well how". This royal decree provided the first mention of the waistcoat. Pepys records "vest" as the original term; the word "waistcoat" derives from the cutting of the coat at waist-level, since at the time of the coining, tailors cut men's formal coats well below the waist (see dress coat). An alternative theory is that, as material was left over from the tailoring of a two-piece suit, it was fashioned into a "waste-coat" to avoid that material being wasted, although recent academic debate has cast doubt on this theory.

During the 17th century, troops of the regular army – and to some degree also local militia – wore waistcoats which were the reverse colour of their overcoats. It is believed that these were made by turning old worn-out standard issue overcoats inside-out (so that the lining colour appeared on the outside) and removing the sleeves. The term "waistcoat" might therefore also be derived from the wastage of the old coat.

During the 17th and 18th centuries, men often wore elaborate and brightly coloured waistcoats, until changing fashions in the nineteenth century narrowed this to a more restricted palette, and the development of lounge suits began the period of matching informal waistcoats.

19th century

After the French Revolution of 1789, anti-aristocratic sentiment in France (and elsewhere in Europe) influenced the wardrobes of both men and women, and waistcoats followed, becoming much less elaborate.  After about 1810 the fit of the waistcoat became shorter and tighter, becoming much more secondary to the frock coat and almost counting as an undergarment, although its  popularity was larger than ever.  With the new dandyism of the early 19th century, the waistcoat started to change roles, moving away from its function as the centrepiece of the visual aspect of male clothing, towards serving as a foundation garment, often with figure-enhancing abilities.

From the 1820s onwards, elite gentlemen—at least those among the more fashionable circles, especially the younger set and the military—wore corsets.  The waistcoat served to emphasise the new popularity of the cinched-in waist for males, and became skin-tight, with the overcoat cut to emphasise the figure: broader shoulders, a pouting chest, and a nipped-in waist. Without a corset, a man's waistcoat often had  whalebone stiffeners and were laced in the back, with reinforced buttons up the front, so that one could pull the lacings in tight to mould the waist into the fashionable silhouette. Prince Albert, husband of Queen Victoria, had a reputation for his tight corsets and tiny waist; and although he lacked popularity during his early reign, men followed his style, and waistcoats became even more restrictive.

This fashion remained throughout the 19th century, although after about 1850 the style changed from that of a corseted look to a straighter line, with less restriction at the waist, so that the waistcoat followed a straighter line up the torso. Toward the end of the century, the Edwardian look made a larger physique more popular—King Edward VII having a large figure.

20th–21st centuries
Waistcoats are popular within the indie and steampunk subcultures in the United States. Vests are often worn both open or closed, over dress shirts and even t-shirts.

Non-formal types of waistcoat have been used in workers uniforms, such as at Walmart prior to 2007, and as high-visibility clothing (usually the bright "safety orange" colour).

During the 2018 FIFA World Cup, the manager of the England football team, Gareth Southgate, was often seen wearing a waistcoat. British retailer Marks & Spencer, the official suit provider for the national team, reported a 35% increase in waistcoat sales during England's first five games at the tournament. Fashion search platform Lyst also reported that online waistcoat searches increased by over 41% during the course of the World Cup. Part-way through the tournament, the Museum of London announced that it hoped to acquire Gareth Southgate's waistcoat in order to display it as part of its permanent collection of historic clothing. In the run up to England's semi-final match against Croatia, the blood cancer charity, Bloodwise, encouraged fans to take part in 'Waistcoat Wednesday' to help raise funds for the charity, while also supporting the England team.

Preliminary timeline and evolution

England

Circa 1660–1700 

King Charles II inaugurated the "vest" (waistcoat) along with the modern ideal of the three-piece suit.  The waistcoats of these three-piece ensembles were the same length as the coat worn over it, most likely knee length, and could be worn for either warmth or display.

Circa 1700–1750 

The coat, waistcoat, and breeches were crafted from the same fabric. Around the turn of the century, the waistcoat became shorter, ending just below the waistline, allowing the breeches to stick out.  When the weather was cold men often would wear more than one waistcoat to stay warm.  As time went on, the vest that matched the coat and trousers was worn for formal wear while a vest of different type or fabric acted as a more casual mode of contrasting dress.

Circa 1750–1770 

Nearly halfway through the century, waistcoats became longer and overlapped with the breeches. Stylistically waistcoats and the rest of the suit began to change in that they matched less.  Instead of consisting of the same, highly decorative fabric, it became popular to wear a waistcoat that complemented the coat and breeches instead of matching it perfectly. For instance, men would mix solids and patterns within the waistcoat, coat, and breeches to create a different look.

Circa 1770–1800 

Waistcoats became shorter, ended at the waist, and were constructed similarly to the coat. This way of styling the vest also was popular in the 19th century throughout the advent of the modern Three-Piece Suit. In order to let the shirt show through, the neck of the vest was left undone. By the turn of the 19th century, it became popular to utilise embroidery and brocade material.

Transition from "waistcoat" to "vest" in the United States

Circa 1750–1850 
The American Revolutionary War brought British influence to the United States and with it came the waistcoat. The waistcoat in the United States originated as formal wear to be worn underneath a coat.  Waistcoats became more ornate including colour and decor.

Circa late 1800 
Waistcoats were styled with new and patterned fabrics but just on the front. Around this time it became popular to use less expensive, contrasting fabric on the back of the waistcoat design, allowing the owner to not spend as much money on the waistcoat as a whole.  The fabrics utilised in the creation of these plain, unseen back panels were linen, cotton, or any other type of fabric used to line clothing items.

Circa 1870 
Waistcoat collars became longer and visible outside of the coat worn over it. These collars were stiffened and would peak out over the coat's lapel.  For both warmth against cold weather or to show off special weaves and contrasting colours, men often would layer their waistcoats.

Circa 1890 
The term vest completely replaced the British term waistcoat in American common vernacular. Waistcoat style followed the guidelines of 1700s England using the same fabric for the three-pieces, and sometimes used patterns of plaid or checks for contrast purposes.

Circa 1900 
Around the turn of the 20th century, men were still wearing waistcoats for luxurious occasions. Waistcoats sometimes even included embroidery or hand-painted designs. At the same time, men began wearing the waistcoat apart from the totality of the three-piece suit and more casually with a variety of bottoms beyond the suit pant (khaki or jean). Waistcoats can be double-breasted with buttons set in a horseshoe pattern. The lower and top buttons may be left undone although not for riding or hunting. Beyond this, some waistcoats were made of certain durable fabrics to withstand being worn for outdoor sport such as fishing or hunting.

Circa 1970 
In the 1970s women began wearing waistcoats as part of their work attire. By the late 1990s and early 2000s it became fashionable for women to wear waistcoats as part of their casual wear.

Typology
Today, there are many types of vests. Some types of vests include but are not limited to:
 Biker (motorcycle) vest: The cut-off is a type of vest typically made from a denim or leather jacket with sleeves removed. Popular among bikers in North America and Europe, they are often decorated with patches of logos or pictures of biker related subjects.
 Fishing vest: carries a profusion of external pockets for carrying fishing tackle.
 Billiards or pool competitions: vests-waistcoats are worn as formal attire by competitors. 
 Army: many regiments especially cavalry have their own regimental waistcoats to be worn with formal outfits.
 Fringed vest: hippie movement of the 1960s inspired this folk style.
 Hunting vest: padded sleeveless jacket.
 Sweater vest: (American and Canadian English) This may also be called a slipover, sleeveless sweater, or, in British English, a tank top or wooly weskit.  In Australia, this may be colloquially referred to as a baldwin.
Puffer vest, body warmer, or gilet: a sleeveless jacket padded with down.

Gallery

See also
 Bulletproof vest
 Jacket
 Mirzai (garment)
 Suicide vest
 Sleeveless shirt
 High-visibility clothing (yellow vests)
 The Doctor (Doctor Who)
 White Rabbit
 Georgian era
 Regency era
 Victorian era
 Edwardian era
 The Master (Doctor Who)

References

External links

 Waistcoats in the collections of the Bowes Museum
 Waistcoats in the collections of the Philadelphia Museum of Art
 Waistcoats on the collections of the Victoria and Albert Museum

17th-century fashion
18th-century fashion
19th-century fashion
20th-century fashion
21st-century fashion
History of clothing (Western fashion)
History of fashion
Medieval European costume
Suits (clothing)
Vests